Marie of France (1145 – 11 March 1198) was a French princess who became Countess of Champagne by marriage to Henry I, Count of Champagne. She was regent of the county of Champagne three times: during the absence of her spouse between 1179 and 1181; during the minority of her son Henry II, Count of Champagne in 1181–1187; and finally during the absence of her son between 1190 and 1197.

Early life 
Marie's birth was hailed as a "miracle" by Bernard of Clairvaux, an answer to his prayer to bless the marriage between her mother Eleanor of Aquitaine and her father, Louis VII. She was just two years old when her parents led the Second Crusade to the Holy Land. Not long after their return in 1152, when Marie was seven, her parents' marriage was annulled. Custody of Marie and her younger sister, Alix, was awarded to their father, since they were at that time the only heirs to the French throne. Both Louis and Eleanor remarried quickly; Eleanor married King Henry II and became Queen of England. Louis remarried first Constance of Castile (d. 1160) and then Adele of Champagne on 13 November 1160. Marie had numerous half-siblings on both her mother's and father's side, including the eventual kings Philip II of France and John and Richard I of England.

Marriage 
In 1153, Marie was betrothed to Henry of Champagne by her father Louis. These betrothals were arranged based on the intervention of Bernard of Clairvaux, as reported in the contemporary chronicle of Radulfus Niger. After her betrothal, Marie was sent to live with the Viscountess Elizabeth of Mareuil-sy-Aÿ and then to the abbey of Avenay in Champagne for her Latin-based education. In 1159, Marie married Henry I, Count of Champagne.

Regencies 
Marie became regent for Champagne when her husband Henry I went on pilgrimage to the Holy Land from 1179 until 1181. While her husband was away, Marie's father died and her half-brother, Philip Augustus, became king of France. He confiscated his mother's dower lands and married Isabelle of Hainaut, who was previously betrothed to Marie's eldest son. This prompted Marie to join a party of disgruntled nobles—including the queen mother Adela of Champagne and the archbishop of Reims—in plotting unsuccessfully against Philip. Eventually, relations between Marie and her royal brother improved. Marie's husband died soon after his return from the Holy Land in 1181, leaving her again as regent for her young son Henry.

Marie, who had retired to the nunnery of Château de Fontaines-les-Nonnes near Meaux (1187–1190), served again as regent for Champagne as her son Henry II joined the Third Crusade from 1190 to 1197. He remained in the Levant, marrying Queen Isabella I of Jerusalem in 1192. Over the course of her regencies, Champagne was transformed from a patchwork of territories into a significant principality.

Death
Marie died on 11 March 1198, not long after hearing the news of her son's death. She was buried in Meaux Cathedral.

French religious war
On 25 June 1562, rioting Huguenots devastated many edifices, including the Cathedral of Maux; it was on this occasion that the tomb of Marie de Champagne, located in the choir, was destroyed.

Literary patronage 

Marie was a patron of literature and her court became a sphere of influence on authors and poets such as Andreas Capellanus, who served in her court and referred to her several times in his writing, Chrétien de Troyes, who credits her with the idea for his Lancelot: The Knight of the Cart, the troubadours Bertran de Born and Bernart de Ventadorn, Gautier d'Arras and Conon de Bétune.

Being literate in both French and Latin, she amassed and maintained her own extensive library. Marie's half-brother King Richard, mentions her in a stanza from his celebrated poem J'a nuns hons pris, lamenting his captivity in Austria, was addressed to her.

Issue
Marie and her husband Henri I of Champagne had:
Henry II of Champagne (1166–1197), married Isabelle of Jerusalem in 1192 
Scholastique of Champagne (1172–1219), married William IV of Macon
Marie of Champagne (c. 1174–1204), married Baldwin I of Constantinople
Theobald III of Champagne (1179–1201), married Blanche of Navarre

Genealogical table

Notes

References

Sources

1145 births
1198 deaths
12th-century French people
12th-century women rulers
French princesses
House of Capet
French patrons of literature
Countesses of Champagne
12th-century French women
Daughters of kings